Janina Brzostowska (1907-1986) was a Polish poet, novelist and translator.

Life
Janina Brzostowska was born in Wadowice, the daughter of a high school principal and pianist. She studied Polish and French at the Jagiellonian University in Cracow, where her family moved. In 1924 she joined the "Czartak" group of poets, and published her first volume of poetry, On Land and My Love, in 1925. She then formally left Czartak in 1929, though she maintained ties with the other poets there.

Brzostowska moved to Warsaw, publishing her first novel, The Jobless of Warsaw, in 1933. The novel was removed from publication by the censors. Her second novel, A Woman Conquers the World, dealt with a woman's coming of age. From 1938 to 1939, Brzostowska helped edit the bimonthly Skawa. In 1939 she published two volumes of lyrical verse, dealing with love and the passage of time. During the German occupation of Poland, Brzostowska joined the resistance movement. Deported from Warsaw after the 1944 Uprising, she was one of the first to return to the ruins of the city. She kept writing poetry after the war, publishing a complete translation of the Songs of Sappho in 1961.

Works

Poetry
 (tr.) Pieśni by Sappho, 1961
 Zanim noc... [Until the night...], 1961
 Czas nienazwany [Time without name], 1964
 Obrona światła [In defence of light], 1968
 Pozdrowienie [Greetings], 1969
 Szczęścia szukamy [In search of happiness], 1974
 Eros, 1977
 Poezje zebrane [Collected poems], 1981.

Novels
 Bezrobotni Warszawy [The Jobless of Warsaw], 1933
 Kobieta zdobywa swiat [A Woman Conquers the World], 1937

References

1907 births
1986 deaths
Polish translators
Polish women poets
Polish women novelists
20th-century translators
20th-century Polish poets
20th-century Polish novelists
20th-century Polish women writers
People from Wadowice
Jagiellonian University alumni
Greek–Polish translators